Moritz Reichert (born 15 March 1995) is a German professional volleyball player. He is part of the German national team. At the professional club level, he plays for Tourcoing LM.

Honours

Clubs
 National championships
 2014/2015  German Cup, with VfB Friedrichshafen
 2014/2015  German Championship, with VfB Friedrichshafen
 2017/2018  French Championship, with Tours VB
 2018/2019  German Championship, with Berlin Recycling Volleys
 2019/2020  German SuperCup, with Berlin Recycling Volleys
 2019/2020  German Cup, with Berlin Recycling Volleys

References

External links

 
 Player profile at PlusLiga.pl 
 Player profile at Volleybox.net

1995 births
Living people
Sportspeople from Saarbrücken
German men's volleyball players
German expatriate sportspeople in France
Expatriate volleyball players in France
German expatriate sportspeople in Poland
Expatriate volleyball players in Poland
Trefl Gdańsk players
Outside hitters